Percy Scawen Wyndham DL JP MP (30 January 1835 – 13 March 1911) was a British soldier, Conservative Party politician, collector and intellectual. He was one of the original members of The Souls, and built Clouds House at East Knoyle, Wiltshire.

Background and education
Wyndham was a younger son of George Wyndham, 1st Baron Leconfield, and his wife Mary Fanny Blunt, daughter of the Reverend William Blunt, and was educated at Eton. He served in the Coldstream Guards and achieved the rank of captain.

Political career
In 1860, Wyndham was returned to Parliament as one of two representatives for Cumberland West (succeeding his uncle Sir Henry Wyndham), a seat he held until 1885. He was also a Deputy Lieutenant and Justice of the Peace for Sussex. He owned the Wiltshire manor of Pertwood from 1877 until his death, and he became a member of Wiltshire County Council and was High Sheriff of Wiltshire for 1896.

Family

Wyndham married Madeline Caroline Frances Eden Campbell, daughter of Sir Guy Campbell, 1st Baronet, and his wife Pamela FitzGerald, daughter of Lord Edward FitzGerald. They were both prominent members of The Souls. They had two sons and three daughters who were also members of The Souls. George Wyndham was a politician and man of letters, while Guy Wyndham was a soldier.

Their eldest daughter Mary married the 11th Earl of Wemyss and March, and their second daughter Madeline married Charles Adeane. Their third daughter Pamela married firstly Lord Glenconner and was the mother of among others Stephen Tennant, and secondly Sir Edward Grey. Wyndham commissioned the now-famous painting of his daughters, The Wyndham Sisters, by John Singer Sargent. The trio are the centre of the 2014 book Those Wild Wyndhams by Claudia Renton.

Percy Wyndham died in March 1911, aged 76. His wife survived him by nine years and died in March 1920.

Spiritualism

Wyndham was a spiritualist who took interest in parapsychology. He was a friend of the medium Stainton Moses and a member of the London Spiritualist Alliance.

Wyndham was an early member of the Society for Psychical Research. In 1884, he attended a séance with the medium William Eglinton and was impressed by his slate-writing phenomena. However, Eglinton was exposed as a fraud by other researchers.

References

Brief biography

External links 
 

1835 births
1911 deaths
People educated at Eton College
Coldstream Guards officers
Conservative Party (UK) MPs for English constituencies
Deputy Lieutenants of Sussex
English spiritualists
English justices of the peace
Members of Wiltshire County Council
Parapsychologists
UK MPs 1865–1868
UK MPs 1868–1874
UK MPs 1874–1880
UK MPs 1880–1885
Younger sons of barons
Percy